Marion Brooks Natural Area is a state forest natural area in Moshannon State Forest in Benezette Township, Elk County in the U.S. state of Pennsylvania. The  natural area is on the northwest edge of Quehanna Wild Area. It was originally known as Paige Run Natural Area; in 1975 it was renamed in honor of Marion E. Brooks, a local environmentalist. The area was set aside to protect one of the largest known stands of white birch trees in the eastern United States; in this region the tree is fairly close to the southern limit of its native range.

References

Protected areas of Elk County, Pennsylvania